Cosme Prenafeta García (born December 9, 1971 in Barcelona, Catalonia, Spain) is a Spanish volleyball player who represented his native country at the 2000 Summer Olympics in Sydney, Australia. There he finished ninth place with the Men's National Team.

References
  Spanish Olympic Committee

1971 births
Living people
Spanish men's volleyball players
Volleyball players at the 2000 Summer Olympics
Olympic volleyball players of Spain
Sportspeople from Barcelona